The 1895 U.S. Open was the first U.S. Open, held on Friday, October 4, at Newport Golf Club in Newport, Rhode Island. Horace Rawlins won the inaugural event, two strokes ahead of runner-up Willie Dunn.

Eleven players began the tournament (three withdrew before play began), completing four loops around Newport's nine holes, which measured .  At the end of the first 18-holes Willie Campbell, Willie Dunn, and James Foulis were tied for the lead with 89, with Horace Rawlins two back at 91. Rawlins shot 41 on each of the last two loops of the course to post an 82 and 173 total, two ahead of Dunn and three ahead of Foulis and Canadian Andrew Smith, the lone amateur in the field. Rawlins won a winner's share of $150 and a gold medal.

The U.S. Open was played a day after the U.S. Amateur championship. The two championships were held on the same course for the next two years, at Shinnecock Hills Golf Club in 1896 and the Chicago Golf Club in 1897. The U.S. Open was 36 holes total through 1897, increased to 72 in 1898.

The golf championships at Newport in 1895 were originally scheduled for September, but were postponed due to the America's Cup yacht races, won by Defender.

Final leaderboard
Friday, October 4, 1895

(a) denotes amateur

References

External links
USGA Championship Database
Mid Herts Golf Club − Who was Horace Rawlins?

U.S. Open (golf)
Golf in Rhode Island
Newport, Rhode Island
U.S. Open (golf)
U.S. Open (golf)
October 1895 sports events